The Beaches is a local service district and designated place in the Canadian province of Newfoundland and Labrador. It is southwest of Baie Verte.

Geography 
Beaches is in Newfoundland within Subdivision E of Division No. 5.

Demographics 

Government 
Beaches is a local service district (LSD) that is governed by a committee responsible for the provision of certain services to the community. The chair of the LSD committee is Douglas Osmond.

Notable Person
Donna Morrissey

See also 
List of communities in Newfoundland and Labrador
List of designated places in Newfoundland and Labrador
List of local service districts in Newfoundland and Labrador

References 

Populated coastal places in Canada
Designated places in Newfoundland and Labrador
Local service districts in Newfoundland and Labrador